Ludwig Kunstmann (9 December 1877 – 27 March 1961) was a German sculptor. His work was part of the sculpture event in the art competition at the 1936 Summer Olympics.

References

1877 births
1961 deaths
20th-century German sculptors
20th-century German male artists
German male sculptors
Olympic competitors in art competitions
People from Regensburg